Ping'anli station is an interchange station on Line 4, Line 6 and Line 19 of Beijing Subway.

Station Layout 
Both the lines 4, 6 and 19 stations have underground island platforms.

Exits 
There are 11 exits, lettered A, B, C, D, E, F, G, H, J, K, L. Exits B and F are accessible.

Gallery

References

External links
 

Railway stations in China opened in 2009
Beijing Subway stations in Xicheng District